Gogana cottrillii is a moth in the family Drepanidae first described by Jeremy Daniel Holloway in 1976. It is found on Borneo and Peninsular Malaysia.

References

Moths described in 1976
Drepaninae